Sesame Street Spaghetti Space Chase is a dark ride in the New York section of Universal Studios Singapore at Resorts World Sentosa. It officially opened on 1 March 2013.

History
During the early planning phases of Universal Studios Singapore, park officials wanted to have a Sesame Street attraction. However, this plan was sidelined in favour of attractions with more marketing power.

In late 2009 and early 2010 when full details of Universal Studios Singapore were released, the park planned to have an attraction entitled Stage 28. It was set to be a walkthrough located in the New York zone of the park that showcased some of Universal Studios' feature films and props. At the opening of Universal Studios Singapore on 18 March 2010, Stage 28 did not open. For several months, the official website indicated the attraction would be opening soon. These plans were later abandoned.

On 17 May 2012, Universal Studios Singapore began a small teaser campaign which included two short videos about their next addition. On 24 May 2012, Universal Studios Singapore officially announced that they would be partnering with Sesame Street. As part of the partnership, the park would host Sesame Street live shows from 28 May 2012 and would open a dark ride by the end of 2012. Existing food, beverage and merchandise outlets such as The Brown Derby were also rethemed. On 6 October 2012, Universal Studios Singapore unveiled the marquee of its latest attraction, Sesame Street Spaghetti Space Chase. The ride soft opened to annual passholders in the middle of February 2013. The ride finally opened to visitors on 1 March 2013.

Plot

The attraction details Elmo and Super Grover 2.0 (referred here simply as Super Grover, his alter-ego's original title prior to his upgrade in 2010) traveling into space to rescue the stolen spaghetti from Macaroni the Merciless and his villain partners.

Cast
 Fran Brill - Zoe
 Leslie Carrara-Rudolph - Abby Cadabby, "Super Space Helper"
 Eric Jacobson - Bert, Grover/Super Grover
 Kevin Clash - Elmo
 Joey Mazzarino - Macaroni the Merciless, Murray Monster
 Jerry Nelson - Count von Count, SSNN Announcer
 Carmen Osbahr - Rosita
 Martin P. Robinson - Telly, Martian #1
 David Rudman - Baby Bear· Cookie Monster
 Caroll Spinney - Big Bird, Oscar the Grouch
 Matt Vogel - Anderson Cucumber, Martian #2
 Steve Whitmire - Ernie

See also
 E.T. Adventure

References

External links
 

Amusement rides introduced in 2013
Amusement rides manufactured by Intamin
Dark rides
Sesame Street
Universal Parks & Resorts attractions by name
Universal Studios Singapore
2013 establishments in Singapore
Amusement rides based on television franchises
Outer space in amusement parks
Licensed properties at Universal Parks & Resorts